Coremas is a municipality in the state of Paraíba in the Northeast Region of Brazil.

Coremas was born as a village of the Carirì Indians, and it became a city only in 1954.

Famous people 
 Shaolin, 1971, humorist

See also
List of municipalities in Paraíba

References

External links 
 Site of Municipality

Municipalities in Paraíba